Vukašin Poleksić (Serbian Cyrillic: Bукaшин Пoлeкcић, born 30 August 1982) is a Montenegrin retired football goalkeeper.

Club career
Poleksić started his career at FK Sutjeska Nikšić, breaking into the first team in 2000. During this time he also spent time on loan at U.S. Lecce, and eventually joined them on a free transfer. After a brief second spell with FK Sutjeska Nikšić, he joined Hungarian Championship side FC Tatabánya. In 2007/08 he joined Debreceni VSC, and became their first-choice goalkeeper for the next 3 seasons.

On 24 June 2010 Poleksić was banned from all football activities until 30 June 2012 for failing to report an attempted match fixing. Investigations showed these attempts failed, and the offers had been rejected by Poleksić, however UEFA rules state all players and officials must report any match fixing attempt. On 5 May 2011 the Court of Arbitration for Sport rejected the appeal and upheld UEFA decision.

In 2014, he joined Kecskeméti TE on loan. After one season at Pécsi Mecsek FC, he returned to his hometown club FK Sutjeska Nikšić.

International career
In 2002, he made his debut for FR Yugoslavia against Ecuador. He continued his international career for the newly formed Montenegro making his debut in his country's first ever competitive match on 24 March 2007, a friendly against Hungary in Podgorica. He has earned a total of 38 caps, scoring no goals. His final international was a May 2016 friendly match against Turkey.

References

External links
Player profile on Serbian National Team page
HLSZ 

1982 births
Living people
Footballers from Nikšić
Association football goalkeepers
Serbia and Montenegro footballers
Serbia and Montenegro international footballers
Montenegrin footballers
Montenegro international footballers
Dual internationalists (football)
FK Sutjeska Nikšić players
FK Čelik Nikšić players
U.S. Lecce players
FC Tatabánya players
Debreceni VSC players
Kecskeméti TE players
Pécsi MFC players
Békéscsaba 1912 Előre footballers
Vasas SC players
First League of Serbia and Montenegro players
Serie B players
Serie A players
Second League of Serbia and Montenegro players
Nemzeti Bajnokság I players
Nemzeti Bajnokság II players
Montenegrin First League players
Serbia and Montenegro expatriate footballers
Expatriate footballers in Italy
Serbia and Montenegro expatriate sportspeople in Italy
Montenegrin expatriate footballers
Expatriate footballers in Hungary
Montenegrin expatriate sportspeople in Hungary